David Watts may refer to:

People 
David G. Watts, Welsh games designer and publisher
David P. Watts, American professor of anthropology at Yale University
David Watts (biogeographer), founding editor of the Journal of Biogeography
David Watts (rower) (born 1992), Australian rower
David Watts (rugby union) (1886–1916), Wales rugby international player
David Watts, Baron Watts (born 1951), British Labour Party politician
David Watts (teacher) (?–2013), British teacher and amateur sound recordist
David George Watts (1931–2016), English local historian
David Fraser Watts (born 1979), known as Fraser Watts, Scottish cricketer

Other 
"David Watts" (song), a 1967 song by Ray Davies and the Kinks, later covered by the Jam
David Watts, a character in William Boyd's novel Armadillo, whose name is taken from the Kinks' song

See also
David Watt (disambiguation)

Watts, David